Kalasin University (KSU) is a government university located in Kalasin Province. It was established in 2015 from the merger of the Kalasin Rajabhat University and the Kalasin Campus of Rajamangala University of Technology Isan.

History 
Kalasin University was established regarding the Kalasin University Act. 2015 which was announced in Royal Thai Government Gazette volume 132, section 86 A, issued on September 8, 2015. It stated the combination between Rajamangala University of Technology Isan, Kalasin Campus and Kalasin Rajabhat University to be Kalasin University which is the juristic person and government section operating under the law of Budgetary Means and Office of Higher Education Commission. Regarding section 6 of Kalasin University Act 2015, the university is the educational institute providing knowledge and expertise in profession and advanced professions with the purposes of providing education, promoting research for developing knowledge and technology, providing academic services for local communities and society, providing educational opportunities for people, preserving  religious, arts, cultures, and sports, supporting the government activities, participating in local development, and preserving environment.

Symbol of Kalasin University

Emblem of Kalasin University 
Kalasin University’s logo and meaning :
The top of Sema (sculptured tablet stone) is derived from three shapes as explained below :
The top of the Yakhu pagoda, the holy pagoda of Kalasin province, symbolizes to the wisdom and morality which are the sublime of human being. 
Sema (Sculptured tablet stone) which is the identity of Kalasin province refers to the civilization, greatness, religious and arts.
Candle flame refers to the brightness, knowledge, wisdom, and morality.
Together palms refers to integrations of two universities which are Rajamangala University of Technology Isan, Kalasin Campus and Kalasin Rajabhat University.
Drop of water refers to the fertilization of Kalasin province.
Three levels of candle flame refer to the integration of sciences, technology, and local wisdom regarding the determination and missions of Kalasin University focusing on develop local community and society.

Symbolic Color  
Symbolic color of Kalasin University is leadwort blue which refers to the fertilization, knowledge and wisdom, independence, inspiration, and creativity. Leadwort blue also means the graduate who is patient, determined, calm, and polite.

Symbolic Tree 
The tree of Kalasin University is Ma Haad or Artocarpus lacucha

Directory of President of Kalasin University 
 20156 March 2016    Assistant Professor Noppon Kosirayotin. (Acting President)
 6 March 201612 June 2016   Associate Professor Jirapan Huaysan. (Acting President)
 12 June 2016present  Associate Professor Jirapan Huaysan.

References 

Universities in Thailand
Kalasin province
Educational institutions established in 2015
2015 establishments in Thailand